The National Dodgeball League (NDL) rules were created to standardize professional dodgeball matches to make them fair and consistent. All NDL sanctioned amateur, college, and youth events abide exclusively by NDL rules. The rules are subject to modification at the sole discretion of the NDL to accommodate and respond to the ever evolving game of dodgeball.

Court

The official dimensions for a regulation court are as follows:

Approximately  to  should be allotted for an out of bounds area, allowing officials to move freely along the sidelines.

Every effort should be made to obtain the correct dimensions. However court size may be adjusted to best suit the available space.

Equipment

Stinger Division
Six regulation size rubber balls should be used: 4 blockers and 2 stingers. 
Prior to starting the game, the balls should be arranged along the center court line as follows: blocker, stinger, blocker, blocker, stinger, blocker.

Big Ball Divisions
Six regulation size rubber balls should be used: 6 blockers. 
Prior to starting the game, the balls should be arranged along the center court line.

No-Sting Divisions
Six regulation size no-sting balls (typically foam) should be used: 6 blockers. 
Prior to starting the game, the balls should be arranged along the center court line.

Players

Teams
Teams consist of six players with up to four substitutes. It is normally said that all players must be in uniform.

Coed teams may consist of either gender, however at least two players of each gender must participate at the start of each game.

Open teams may consist of either gender. Any ratio of men and women may participate, including all male and all female teams.

Substitutions
Substitutions must be made prior to the start of the game. No substitutions can be made during a game, except in cases of injury.

Retrievers
Retrievers are individuals designated to retrieve balls that go out of play. Teams are responsible for providing retrievers. The number of retrievers required will be determined by the tournament director.

Teams may use players that are out as retrievers.

Retrievers may not enter the court at any time.

Retrievers may not wear jerseys of the same style as their team uniform.

Retrievers are only allowed to field balls from their side of the court.

Matches
A regulation match consists of a predetermined odd number of games of a single game type. The number of games and/or the time allotted may be altered to best suit time and attendance.

Game types

Elimination game
A game played until all opponents on one side have been eliminated. The first team to eliminate all its opponents is declared the winner.

Timed game
A game played until a predetermined time limit expires or all opponents are eliminated on one side. If time expires, all remaining players are counted. The team with most players remaining wins the game.

Scored game
A scored game is played as either an elimination or timed game with points awarded not for the win, but for the number of players remaining "in" at the end of each game.

Game play
Play begins with all players positioned behind their team's endline.

The Rush
The Rush occurs at the beginning of each game or reset.

Upon the official's signal, both teams rush to center court and attempt to retrieve as many balls as possible. 
A team may rush with as many or as few players as it wants, but at least one person from each team has to Rush. 
There is no limit to how many balls an individual player may retrieve.

Players may not slide or dive head first into the neutral zone or they will be called out.

Crossing over the neutral zone will result in an "out."

Players may not physically grab and pull another player across the neutral zone or prevent them from returning to their side of the court.

Putting a ball in play
The player and the ball must go completely behind the attack line. During the Rush, any ball retrieved from the neutral zone must be returned behind the attack line before it may be thrown at an opponent. A ball that hasn't crossed the attack line is considered a dead ball, any hits or catches are voided plays.

There are several ways to put a ball into play following a Rush:
 A player carries the ball across the attack line. 
 A player passes the ball to a teammate who is behind or carries it across the attack line. 
 A player rebounds the ball off the back wall of a closed court.

Time Outs
There are 2

Outs
A player shall be deemed "out":

 When a live ball hits any part of the player's body, clothing, or uniform. 
 If a player is hit by a live ball rebounding off another player or ball lying on the court. 
 If a defending player catches a live ball they have thrown.

Players shall return from the Queue in the order they were put "out" (i.e. first "out," first "in").

Blocking
Players can defend themselves by blocking the ball in flight with another ball but must retain control over the ball they are blocking with. A player dropping or losing possession of the blocking ball is deemed "out."

Any blocked ball rebounding off another ball is considered live. Any player hit by the rebounding ball is deemed "out."

Pinching
The act of squeezing the ball in order to alter the thrown or blocked ball is not allowed.

Stalling
The act of intentionally delaying the game.

If a referee determines that a player or team is stalling, the referee will warn player or team. If the stalling continues, at the referee's discretion, player or team will lose possession of all balls on their side.

If both teams are stalling a reset should occur.

Out of Bounds Rule
If any part of the player's body touches the endlines or far neutral zone line, the player shall be deemed "out".

Momentum may carry a player out of bounds while making a catch.  If control of the ball was established prior going out of bounds, this is NOT deemed an out.

Neutral Zone Rule
A player may safely step into the neutral zone but not across the centerline. Any player crossing over the centerline (located in between the two sections of the neutral zone) is deemed "out."

Sacrifice Fly
An airborne attack, where an attacking player may legally cross the neutral zone to hit an opponent but the ball must leave the attacker's hand before any part of the attacker's body touches the opponent's territory. If successful, the player hit is out and Attacking player remains in.

Headshots
A headshot occurs when a player is hit directly in the head by a high thrown ball. A high thrown ball is a ball thrown above shoulder height of the person hit in the head. Shoulder height is the height of the shoulders of the player in an upright standing position. If a player is ducking or crouching and hit in the head this will NOT be deemed a headshot as the ball was NOT thrown above shoulder height.

In tournament/events allowing headshots, any person hit on any portion of their body will be considered "out".

In tournament/events NOT allowing headshots, a player hit in the head by a high thrown ball will be deemed "safe", and any thrower committing a headshot will be deemed "out." A player raising their hands/arms to defend themselves from a headshot will not be called "out" if the ball hits their hands/arms above shoulder height in the act of defending themselves; and the thrower will be called "safe".

A player unsuccessful in their attempt to catch a high thrown ball will be deemed "out". It is the official's judgment as to whether the player is defending themselves or attempting to catch the ball.

A ball deflected by another ball, player, or object is no longer considered a high thrown ball. Should the ball strike a player in the head, that player shall be deemed "out", even if their own block deflected the ball.

Uniforms
Uniforms and protective equipment are considered part of the player. Any player hit on any part of their uniform or protective equipment will be considered "out". The NDL does not allow players to wear gloves, baseball caps, visors, or bandanas during play.

Each team should wear uniforms as specified in the NDL uniform guidelines.

References

External links
 The Official Website of the NDL
 Official Dodgeball Rules & NDL Regulations of Play

External links
 The Official Website of the NDL
 The Official NDL Rule Book

Sports rules and regulations